Karimabad (also Romanized as Karīmābād) is a village in Azadeh Rural District, Moshrageh District, Ramshir County, Khuzestan Province, Iran. At the 2006 census, its population was 56, in 12 families.

References 

Populated places in Ramshir County